The following forces and commanders fought at the Battle of Hampton Roads, Virginia, March 8–9, 1862.

Union
US Army (stationed at Fort Monroe)
1st Brigade, 1st Division, Dept of Virginia - Brig. Gen. Joseph K. F. Mansfield
 20th Indiana Infantry Regiment - Colonel William Brown
 7th New York Volunteer Infantry - Colonel George W. Von Schack
 11th New York Volunteer Infantry Regiment - Colonel Charles M. Loeser

US Navy
North Atlantic Blocking Squadron - Captain (Flag Officer) Louis M. Goldsborough
Senior officer present: Captain John Marston
Ironclad monitor:
Monitor - Lieutenant John L. Worden
50-gun screw frigates:
Minnesota - Captain Gershom J. Van Brunt
Roanoke - Captain John Marston
44-gun sailing frigates:
St. Lawrence - Captain Hugh Y. Purviance
Congress - Lieutenant Joseph B. Smith
24-gun sailing sloop-of-war:
Cumberland - Lieutenant George U. Morris (acting)
auxiliary gunboats:
Mystic
Zouave - Acting Master Henry Reaney
Dragon - Acting Master William Watson
miscellaneous support craft
Whitehall (tug) - Acting Master William J. Baulsir
Young America (tug)
Cambridge (tug) - Commander William A. Parker

Confederate
CS Navy
Office of Orders and Details (responsible for naval defenses of Norfolk) - Captain (Flag Officer) Franklin Buchanan
Ironclad:
 Virginia - Captain Franklin Buchanan, Lieutenant Catesby ap Roger Jones
Tender gunboats
 Raleigh - Lieutenant Joseph W. Alexander
 Beaufort - Lieutenant William H. Parker
James River Squadron - Commander John R. Tucker
Gunboats
 Patrick Henry - Commander John R. Tucker
 Jamestown - Lieutenant Joseph N. Barney
 Teaser - Lieutenant William A. Webb

Notes

References
Davis, William C. Duel between the first ironclads. Doubleday, 1975.
Scharf, J. Thomas, History of the Confederate States Navy from its organization to the surrender of its last vessel; its stupendous struggle with the great Navy of the United States, the engagements fought in the rivers and harbors of the South and upon the high seas, blockade-running, first use of iron-clads and torpedoes, and privateer history. New York, Rogers & Sherwood, 1887; reprint, Random House, 1996.
Still, William N. Jr., Iron afloat: the story of the Confederate armorclads. Vanderbilt University, 1971; reprint, University of South Carolina, 1985. 

American Civil War orders of battle